Fundella agapella is a species of snout moth in the genus Fundella. It was described by William Schaus in 1923, and is known from the Galapagos Islands.

References

Moths described in 1923
Phycitinae